"A Dialogue between Joseph Smith and the Devil" (or "Joe Smith and the Devil") is an 1844 short story by Parley P. Pratt, generally credited as the first work of Mormon fiction. A piece of closet drama or, more precisely, a dialogue, "Dialogue" begins with the devil putting up handbills:

They engage in a conversation which manages wit while still engaging in Pratt's proselytory purposes. The two part on friendly terms:

The story first appeared on the front page of the New York Herald, August 25, 1844.

Notes 
1.The date is frequently erroneously cited as January 1, 1844, but the August date is correct.

References

External links
 Full text from BYU's Mormon Literature Website

1844 short stories
American short stories
Cultural depictions of Joseph Smith
Fiction about the Devil
Works originally published in the New York Herald
1844 in Christianity
Dialogues
Works by Parley P. Pratt
Works about Joseph Smith